Hala Halim is an Egyptian academic and translator.

She studied literature at university, obtaining a BA from Alexandria University in 1985 and an MA from the American University in Cairo in 1992. She completed her doctorate at UCLA in 2004. Halim has written extensively about literature and culture, covering subjects as diverse as Youssef Chahine, EM Forster and Constantine Cavafy. She is currently an assistant professor in the Middle Eastern and Islamic Studies department of New York University.

Halim has translated Mohamed El-Bisatie's novel Clamor of the Lake. The translation won an Egyptian State Incentive Award and was runner-up for the Banipal Prize in 2006.

See also
 List of Arabic-to-English translators

References

New York University faculty
Egyptian academics
Arabic–English translators
Living people
Alexandria University alumni
The American University in Cairo alumni
Egyptian expatriates in the United States
Year of birth missing (living people)